Erycinidia is a genus of satyrid butterflies.

Species
Listed alphabetically:
Erycinidia ducis (Jordan, 1930)
Erycinidia gracilis Rothschild & Jordan, 1905
Erycinidia hemileuca Jordan, 1930
Erycinidia maudei Joicey & Talbot, 1916
Erycinidia tenera Jordan, 1930
Erycinidia virgo (Rothschild & Jordan, 1905)

References

Satyrini
Butterfly genera